Lieutenant-General Charles Schaw Cathcart, 9th Lord Cathcart, KT (21 March 1721 – 14 August 1776) was a British soldier and diplomat. He was also chief of the Clan Cathcart.

Biography
The son of Charles Cathcart, 8th Lord Cathcart, and Marion Shaw, he was born on 21 March 1721. Opposed to the restoration of the Stuart monarchy, he became an aide-de-camp to the Duke of Cumberland and during the Battle of Fontenoy in 1745, was shot in the face. Joshua Reynolds' portrait (1753–55) shows the black silk patch he used to cover the scar on his cheek. This seemingly earned him the soubriquet 'Patch Cathcart'. The following year at the Battle of Culloden, again acting as ADC to Cumberland, Cathcart was once more wounded in battle.

Charles was the last Lord Cathcart to inherit the family estate of Sundrum. Upon inheriting his mother's estates in Greenock he sold Sundrum to James Murray of Broughton in 1758. Through his mother he also inherited Schawpark near Sauchie at Gartmorn. The house dated from 1700. A small group of cottages on the estate were involved in the "manufacture of osnaburgs when visited by Bishop Richard Pococke in 1760.

In 1763 he was created a Knight of the Order of the Thistle.

In August 1768 he arrived as the ambassador at St Petersburg and was he was well received by Catherine the Great. He served, poorly, at the Russian court until 1772. On his return to Britain he was elected Rector of Glasgow University in 1773.

In 1775 he commissioned Robert Adam to remodel Schawpark, but he did not live to see completion of the works.

He died on 14 August 1776.

Personal life and children

On 24 July 1753 he married Jean Hamilton (1722–1771), daughter of Captain Lord Archibald Hamilton and Lady Jane Hamilton.

They had nine children:
 Jane (20 May 1754 – 5 December 1790), first wife of the John Murray, 4th Duke of Atholl
 William Cathcart, 1st Earl Cathcart (17 September 1755 – 16 June 1843)
 Mary (1 March 1757 – 26 June 1792), a celebrated beauty, who married Thomas Graham, 1st Baron Lynedoch
 Louisa (1 June 1758 – 11 July 1843), married first, David Murray, 2nd Earl of Mansfield (1727–1796); married second, The Hon. Robert Fulke Greville
 Charles (28 December 1759 – 10 June 1788)
 John (23 April 1761 – 00 January 1762)
 Archibald (25 July 1764 – 10 October 1841)
 [a son] (7 June 1768; stillborn)
 Catherine Charlotte (8 July 1770 – 20 October 1794), died unmarried

Ranks
He held the following ranks:
Captain, 1742
Colonel, 1750
Major-General, 1758
Lieutenant-General, 1760

References

External links

1721 births
1776 deaths
Lords of Parliament
Knights of the Thistle
Diplomatic peers
Rectors of the University of Glasgow
British Army personnel of the Jacobite rising of 1745
British Army lieutenant generals
Lancashire Fusiliers officers
British Army personnel of the War of the Austrian Succession
Members of the Privy Council of Great Britain
Ambassadors of Great Britain to Russia
Lords High Commissioner to the General Assembly of the Church of Scotland
Scottish representative peers